The Malayan forest skink (Sphenomorphus malayanus) is a species of skink. It is found in Indonesia, Malaysia, and Vietnam.

References

malayanus
Reptiles described in 1888
Taxa named by Giacomo Doria
Fauna of Sumatra
Reptiles of Vietnam
Reptiles of the Malay Peninsula